The 9th Sarasaviya Awards festival (Sinhala: 9වැනි සරසවිය සම්මාන උලෙළ), presented by the Associated Newspapers of Ceylon Limited, was held to honor the best films of 1980 Sinhala cinema on April 4, 1981, at the Bandaranaike Memorial International Conference Hall, Colombo 07, Sri Lanka. Prime Minister Ranasinghe Premadasa was the chief guest at the awards night.

The film Ganga Addara won the most awards with seven including Best Film.

Awards

References

Sarasaviya Awards
Sarasaviya